Alimamy Jalloh (born September 26, 1987) is a Sierra Leonean professional footballer, who currently plays for Lohjan Pallo in Finland.

Career 
He started his football career with his hometown club the Diamond Stars of Kono District in the Sierra Leone National Premier League in 2003. Jalloh joined 2007 from FC Kallon to Finnish club Atlantis FC. After one year with Atlantis FC signed in December 2007 to SoVo and in July 2008 to HIFK. The midfielder signed in January 2010 after two years with HIFK for Lohjan Pallo.

International career 
Jalloh has played for Sierra Leone U-20 team.

References

Living people
1987 births
Sierra Leonean footballers
Expatriate footballers in Finland
Atlantis FC players
HIFK Fotboll players
People from Koidu
Sierra Leonean expatriate footballers
Sierra Leonean expatriate sportspeople in Finland
Association football midfielders